In electronics, a virtual ground  (or virtual earth) is a node of a circuit that is maintained at a steady reference potential, without being connected directly to the reference potential. In some cases the reference potential is considered to be that of the surface of the earth, and the reference node is called "ground" or "earth" as a consequence. 

The virtual ground concept aids circuit analysis in operational amplifier and other circuits and provides useful practical circuit effects that would be difficult to achieve in other ways. 

In circuit theory, a node may have any value of current or voltage but physical implementations of a virtual ground will have limitations of current handling ability and a non-zero impedance which may have practical side effects.

Construction
A voltage divider, using two resistors, can be used to create a virtual ground node. If two voltage sources are connected in series with two resistors, it can be shown that the midpoint becomes a virtual ground if

An active virtual ground circuit is sometimes called a rail splitter. Such a circuit uses an op-amp or some other circuit element that has gain. Since an operational amplifier has very high open-loop gain, the potential difference between its inputs tend to zero when a feedback network is implemented. 
This means that the output supplies the inverting input (via the feedback network) with enough voltage to reduce the potential difference between the inputs to microvolts.
Thus, as far as the amplifier is working in its linear region (output not saturated, frequencies inside the range of the opamp), the voltage at the inverting input terminal remains constant with respect to the real ground, and independent from the loads to which the output may be connected. 
This property is characterized a "virtual ground".

Applications 

Voltage is a differential quantity, which appears between two points. In order to deal only with a voltage (an electrical potential) of a single point, the second point has to be connected to a reference point (ground). Usually, the power supply terminals serve as steady grounds; when the internal points of compound power sources are accessible, they can also serve as real grounds.

If there are no accessible source internal points, external circuit points having steady voltage with respect to the source terminals can serve as artificial virtual grounds. Such a point has to have steady potential, which does not vary when a load is attached.

See also 

Voltage-to-current converter and Current-to-voltage converter show some typical virtual ground applications
Miller theorem applications

References

External links 
 Create a Virtual Ground with the LT1118-2.5 Sink/Source Voltage Regulator
 Rail Splitter, from Abraham Lincoln to Virtual Ground Application note on creating an artificial virtual ground as a reference voltage (Archived from original).
 Creating a Virtual Power Supply Ground
 Inverting configuration shows the application of the virtual ground concept in an inverting amplifier (Archived)

Electrical circuits
Electricity concepts